The Palazzo Orsini Pio Righetti (also Palazzo Pio) is a building in the Roman district of Parione. It was built around 1450 and lies on top of the ruins of the Temple of Venus Victrix of the Theatre of Pompey. In the 17th century the facade was redesigned. It overlooks other neighboring areas of Campo de' Fiori and Piazza del Biscione in Rome, Italy.

It was beneath the courtyard of this Palace on Aug. 8, 1864, that a gilded bronze statue of Hercules was discovered in excellent condition. The statue was donated to Pope Pius IX and is now part of the exhibits of the Vatican Museum.

References

External links 
Palazzo Orsini Pio Righetti

Orsini Pio Righetti